Wang Xiaoshuai (born May 22, 1966) is a Chinese film director, screenwriter and occasional actor. He is commonly grouped under the loose association of filmmakers known as the "Sixth Generation" of the Cinema of China. Like others in this generation, and in contrast with earlier Chinese filmmakers who produced mostly historical drama, Wang proposed a “new urban Chinese cinema [that] has been mainly concerned with bearing witness of a fast- paced transforming China and producing a localized critique of globalization.”

Many of Wang's works are known for their sensitive portrayal of teens and youths, most notable in films such as Beijing Bicycle,  So Close to Paradise, Drifters, and Shanghai Dreams.  His 2008 film In Love We Trust was an exception as it portrays marital strains.

In 2010 Wang was appointed a chevalier of the Ordre des Arts et des Lettres. He also served as a member of the jury of the BigScreen Italia Film Festival 2006, held in Kunming, Yunnan, China.

Early life
Wang Xiaoshuai was born in 1966 in Shanghai but spent the first thirteen years of his life in Guiyang, the capital of Guizhou in southwestern China as a result of upheaval during the Cultural Revolution. While in Guiyang, Wang became interested in and began studying painting. By 1979, he and his family had moved to Wuhan. When he was 15, Wang moved to Beijing where he attended the Central Art Academy Middle School to study painting before eventually studying directing at the Beijing Film Academy.

Career

Early works 
After his graduation from the Beijing Film Academy, Wang spent some time working under the PRC studio system before starting out on his own. His first film, The Days (1993), was an independent feature shot on the weekends in Beijing and starring Wang’s friends as two artists. The film did well overseas, where it announced Wang as a major new voice, but it also caught the wrath of the Chinese authorities, who included Wang in its sweeping ban on six filmmakers (including Tian Zhuangzhuang, Zhang Yuan, and He Jianjun) in April 1994. As a result, Wang followed up The Days with another foray into the art world of Beijing using the moniker "Wu Ming" (literally, "no name" or "anonymous").  Entitled Frozen, the film was shot in 1994 but not released until 1997.

After a lengthy period of self-criticism, Wang was finally allowed to start making films again. In contrast to both Frozen and The Days, which both took place in Beijing, Wang’s next film, So Close to Paradise (1998), saw him return to his childhood home of Wuhan to film a story of two migrant workers who become involved in a kidnapping. So Close to Paradise also marked the first time Wang operated under the Chinese movie-making authorities, but even then, the film was subject to multiple acts of censorship, and it ultimately received a very limited release in China only after many years had passed.

Wang followed up Paradise with the family comedy The House in 1999. Lost to obscurity, The House was essentially Wang's apology to the Beijing Film Studio for the bureaucratic morass that marked the release of So Close to Paradise. Wang decided to direct a simplistic comedy, one that would be sure to pass the censors with a minimum of fuss.

International success 
Despite the numerous films to his credit at this point, it was not until Beijing Bicycle that Wang rose to truly international success. The winner of the Silver Bear Jury Grand Prix at the Berlin Film Festival, Beijing Bicycle wowed critics with its story of a youth's search for his stolen bicycle, particularly with its shades of Vittorio De Sica's 1948 Bicycle Thieves.

After the success of Beijing Bicycle, Wang made Drifters (2003) which screened at the 2003 Cannes Film Festival in competition for the Prix Un Certain Regard, though it didn't win any prizes. Shanghai Dreams (2005), however, managed to win Cannes's Prix du Jury award.

2008 saw the premiere of Wang's film, In Love We Trust (also known as Left Right) in the Berlin Film Festival, a modern drama about a divorced couple, where it would win a Silver Bear for Best Screenplay.  Wang's next project, 11 Flowers recently won the Pusan Promotion Prize or PPP for $20,000.

In 2010 Wang was appointed a chevalier of the Ordre des Arts et des Lettres.

Filmography

As director

As actor

As producer

References

External links

 
 
 Wang Xiaoshuai at the Chinese Movie Database
 Wang Xiaoshuai at Senses of Cinema
 BigScreen Festival homepage

1966 births
Living people
Beijing Film Academy alumni
Film directors from Shanghai
Screenwriters from Shanghai
Chinese film producers
Male actors from Shanghai
Silver Bear for Best Screenplay winners